Julie Kopacsy-Karczag, née Julie Kopacsy, also Julie Kopacsi or Julie Kopacsi-Karczag (b. 13 February 1867 in Komárom, Austria-Hungary [now Komárno, Slovakia] – d. 26 January 1957 in Vienna) was a Hungarian opera singer (soprano).

Life 
Born in Komárom, Kopacsy was sent to Pest for her vocal training as a coloratura singer with Adele Passy-Cornet.

She worked as an operetta soubrette in 1889 in Debrecen, from 1891 to 1894 at the Volkstheater in Budapest, from 1894 to 1896 at the Carltheater in Vienna. She gave guest performances in Berlin, America, Russia and Prague and was then active again in Vienna.

Main roles (selection) 
 La belle Hélène (Jacques Offenbach).
  (Eduard Künnecke).
 Königin von Gamara (Alexander Neumann).
 Die Göttin der Vernunft (Johann Strauss II), as the singer Ernestine.

References 
Notes

Sources
 Accessed 8 January 2019.

External links 

 Ludwig Eisenberg: Großes biographisches Lexikon der Deutschen Bühne im XIX. Jahrhundert. Edition by Paul List, Leipzig 1903,  
 Karczag, Julie on Ludwig Maximilian Universität München

1867 births
1957 deaths
People from Komárom
Hungarian operatic sopranos
19th-century Hungarian women opera singers
20th-century Hungarian women opera singers